The 1923–24 NHL season was the seventh season of the National Hockey League. Four teams each played 24 games. The league champions were the Montreal Canadiens, who defeated the first-place Ottawa Senators in the league playoff. The Canadiens then defeated the Calgary Tigers of the Western Canada Hockey League (WCHL) and Vancouver Maroons of the Pacific Coast Hockey Association (PCHA) to win their second Stanley Cup championship.

League business
At the NHL meeting of February 9, 1924, the NHL discussed plans for expansion into the United States. The same meeting saw the introduction of the new Hart Trophy, to be awarded to the player judged most valuable to his team.

After the suspensions of their own players by the Canadiens, in 1922–23. the NHL decided to take a further role in discipline, as it redefined match fouls, changed fines and adds presidential review for possible further punishment.

Regular season
A newcomer that would become the NHL's first drawing card, Howie Morenz, started his career with the Montreal Canadiens this year. Morenz scored the first goal of his career on December 27, 1923, in the inaugural NHL game at the new Ottawa Auditorium. It was the first of a career 270 goals.

The Hamilton Tigers added Billy Burch and the Green brothers, Shorty and Redvers (nicknamed Red) and now they had a team that could compete nicely with the rest of the league. On December 28, Shorty Green scored at 12:22 of overtime to give Hamilton its first ever road victory over the Ottawa Senators in Ottawa. However, the changes did not pay off this season. The Hamilton Tigers finished last for the fifth season in a row (counting one season as the Quebec Athletics). 
 
The NHL held a mid-season meeting to consider Sprague Cleghorn's suspension. Ottawa claimed he was deliberately injuring opponents, citing a spearing incident against Cy Denneny. The league rejected the charges, and in a game against Ottawa shortly thereafter, Cleghorn charged Lionel Hitchman into the boards and earned a one-game suspension.

A game between Ottawa and the Canadiens was postponed due to a bizarre incident near the end of the season. On their way to Montreal, the Ottawa's train got snowbound near Hawkesbury, Ontario. The team was stuck all night and so Cy Denneny decided to scrounge around for some food, and somehow fell down a well. He was not injured. The game was postponed until the next night and Georges Vezina shut out the Senators 3–0.

Final standings

Playoffs
This was the last season that three leagues competed for the Stanley Cup as, after the season, the PCHA folded. Two of its teams, the Vancouver Maroons and Victoria Cougars, joined the WCHL for the 1924–25 WCHL season.

NHL Championship

The Montreal Canadiens had finished second overall in the NHL regular season standings but in the playoffs, they would upset the first-place Ottawa Senators.

Stanley Cup playoffs
The second place Vancouver Maroons of the PCHA once again faced the first place Seattle Metropolitans and once again, Vancouver would come out on top winning the PCHA league championship. Meanwhile, in the Western Canada Hockey League, the Calgary Tigers won the regular season and the playoffs. The Canadiens owner, Leo Dandurand, wanted Calgary and Vancouver to face off against each other and then have the Canadiens play the winner for the Stanley Cup. Frank Patrick, the president of the PCHA, refused to go along with that idea.

Semi-final

Since Leo Dandurand's request to have Vancouver and Calgary face off first was denied, the first round match-up was the Montreal Canadiens and Vancouver Maroons. The Canadiens swept the best-of-three series two games to none. Game one was played under eastern rules. Game two was played under western rules.

Finals

After sweeping Vancouver, Montreal's next opponent was the Calgary Tigers. Montreal swept them too in a best-of-three series. Howie Morenz scored a hat trick in game one and another goal in the game two, which was transferred to Ottawa because of the slushy ice at Mount Royal Arena. Morenz was body-checked by Cully Wilson of Calgary and suffered a chipped collarbone. The Canadiens swept all three teams they faced during the playoffs en route to their first Stanley Cup since their 1916 Cup win as a member of the NHA.

Playoff scoring leader
Note: GP = Games played; G = Goals; A = Assists; Pts = Points

Awards
The league introduced its first individual award, the Hart Trophy, to the player judged to be "the most valuable player" to their team.

Note: The Prince of Wales Trophy was not in existence yet in 1924. The 1923–24 Canadiens were engraved onto the trophy in 1925–26.

Player statistics

Scoring leaders
Note: GP = Games played; G = Goals; A = Assists; Pts = Points

Source: NHL.

Leading goaltenders
Note: GP = Games Played, GA = Goals Against,  SO = Shutouts, GAA = Goals Against Average
Source: NHL

Coaches
Hamilton Tigers: Percy Lesueur and Ken Randall
Montreal Canadiens: Leo Dandurand
Ottawa Senators: Tommy Gorman
Toronto St. Patricks: Charles Querrie

Debuts
The following is a list of players of note who played their first NHL game in 1923–24 (listed with their first team, asterisk(*) marks debut in playoffs):
Red Green, Hamilton Tigers
Shorty Green, Hamilton Tigers
Howie Morenz, Montreal Canadiens
Sylvio Mantha, Montreal Canadiens
Frank Finnigan, Ottawa Senators

Last games
The following is a list of players of note that played their last game in the NHL in 1923–24 (listed with their last team):
Joe Malone, Montreal Canadiens
Jack Darragh, Ottawa Senators
Amos Arbour, Toronto St. Patricks

Free agency

Transactions

See also
 List of Stanley Cup champions
 Pacific Coast Hockey Association
 Western Canada Hockey League
 List of pre-NHL seasons
 Ice hockey at the 1924 Winter Olympics
 1923 in sports
 1924 in sports

References

 
 
 
 
 

Notes

External links
Hockey Database
NHL.com

 
NHL